FC Bossy Liverpool is an Australian soccer club based in Lurnea, New South Wales who competed in the New South Wales Super League. The club is currently playing in the Southern Districts Football Association.

History
Formed in 1994 by Bosnian immigrants from the Liverpool area of south-west Sydney, their primary supporter base has been the local Bosnian Australian community.

Honours
 NSW Super League:
Premiers (1): 2005
Champions (1): 2008

See also
FC Gazy Auburn

References
Football NSW

Soccer clubs in Sydney
Association football clubs established in 1994
1994 establishments in Australia
Diaspora sports clubs in Australia
European-Australian culture